The first season of MasterChef Singapore began airing on 2 September 2018 and ended on 21 October 2018 on Mediacorp Channel 5. 

The winner of this season was Zander Ng, with Genevieve "Gen" Lee as the runner-up.

Top 18
The top 18 were announced as follows:

Elimination table

 (WINNER) This cook won the competition.
 (RUNNER-UP) This cook finished as a runner-up in the finals.
 (WIN) The cook won the individual challenge (Mystery Box Challenge/ Skills Test or Elimination Test).
 (WIN) The cook was on the winning team in the Team Challenge and directly advanced to the next round.
 (HIGH) The cook was one of the top entries in the individual challenge but didn't win.
 (IN) The cook wasn't selected as a top or bottom entry in an individual challenge.
 (IN) The cook wasn't selected as a top or bottom entry in a team challenge.
 (IMM) The cook didn't have to compete in that round of the competition and was safe from elimination.
 (IMM) The cook was selected by Mystery Box Challenge winner and didn't have to compete in the Elimination Test.
 (PT) The cook was on the losing team in the Team Challenge, competed in the Pressure Test, and advanced.
 (NPT) The cook was on the losing team in the Team Challenge, did not compete in the Pressure Test, and advanced.
 (LOW) The cook was one of the bottom entries in an individual challenge or Pressure Test, and they advanced.
 (SAVED) The cook had the worst dish but was not eliminated from MasterChef.
  (LOW) The cook was one of the bottom entries in the Team Challenge and they advanced.
 (ELIM) The cook was eliminated from MasterChef.

Main guest appearances
 Calvin Kang — Episode 3
 Muhammad Haikal Johari — Episode 4
 Caden & Max Morrice — Episode 5
 Ming Tan — Episode 5
 Marco Pierre White — Episode 7

Episodes

References

2018 Singaporean television seasons